Lembke is a German surname derived from the personal name Lambrecht. Notable people with the name include:
 Anna Lembke, American psychiatrist
 Charles F. Lembke (1865–1923), American architect
 Gerald Lembke (1966), German business economist
 Heinz Lembke (1937–1981), German right-wing extremist
 Janet Lembke (1933–2013), American author, essayist, naturalist, translator and scholar
 Jim Lembke (1961), Missouri politician
 Katja Lembke (1965), German classical archaeologist
 Robert Lembke (1913–1989), German television presenter and game show host

See also 
 Lemke (surname)
 Lembke House, historic house in Albuquerque, New Mexico, built by Charles H. Lembke (1889–1989)

References 

German-language surnames
Surnames from given names